James JA. Thomson  is an American businessman who was the RAND Corporation's president and chief executive officer from August 1989 through October 2011 and a member of the RAND staff since 1981.

Education
Thomson holds a B.S. in physics from the University of New Hampshire (1967) and an M.S. and Ph.D. in physics from Purdue University. He was a postdoctoral research associate in physics (1972) and did basic research in experimental nuclear physics (1972–1974) at the University of Wisconsin–Madison. He has honorary doctorates from Purdue University, Pepperdine University, and the University of New Hampshire.

Career
Thomson previously served as director of RAND's research programs in national security, foreign policy, defense policy, and arms control; vice president in charge of the Project AIR FORCE division; and executive vice president.

From 1977 to January 1981, Thomson was a member of the National Security Council staff at the White House, where he was primarily responsible for defense and arms control matters related to Europe. He was on the staff of the Office of the Secretary of Defense, 1974-1977.

Affiliations
homson is a member of the Council on Foreign Relations, New York; the International Institute for Strategic Studies, London; and the board of the Los Angeles World Affairs Council. He is a director of AK Steel Corporation, Encysive Pharmaceuticals, and Object Reservoir.

Articles
Unclassified Work at RAND

External links
Doctor of Science honorary degree recipient
James Thomson: Mission -- Possible

Year of birth missing (living people)
Living people
RAND Corporation people
University of New Hampshire alumni
Purdue University alumni
Ford administration personnel
Carter administration personnel